WFRA is an American radio station, licensed to Franklin, Pennsylvania; the seat of government for Venango County, Pennsylvania.

WFRA broadcasts at the assigned frequency of 1450 kHz at a full-time power of a thousand watts.  WFRA is owned by Forever Broadcasting, LLC; which also owns its primary programming vehicle, the Allegheny News Talk Sports Network.

History

WFRA went on the air in 1958, three years after the debut of its affiliate station, WTIV in Titusville, about 15 miles north of Franklin just north of the Crawford-Venango County border.  Though within close proximity of each other, owner and founder Robert H. Sauber was allowed to put another AM station on the air because the two stations were in separate counties, thus meeting more stringent FCC ownership limits at the time.

Like WTIV, WFRA boasted a full-service format of news, talk, sports, and middle of the road music, which was typical (and still is, though to a lesser degree today) of small-town AM radio stations.  Though co-owned, both stations (the latter doing business as Northwestern Pennsylvania Broadcasting Company, Inc.) were still managed and operated very separately, with Sauber's son Thomas running the station in its later years.

In March 1971, Sauber put an FM station on the air, WVEN, which simulcast some programming of its AM affiliate in its early years.  The station later became known as WFRA-FM.  However, as more and more cars became equipped with FM radios, WFRA-FM finally broke away from WFRA completely, forming its own identity.

In July 2000, Sauber wanted to retire and put his stations up for sale.  All three were purchased by Altoona-based Forever Broadcasting, LLC for an undisclosed sum.  Sauber died in October 2004 at the age of 72.

Programming
For most of the broadcast day, WFRA is a "trimulcast" of three radio stations (including itself) in Venango and Crawford Counties.  The two others are WTIV and WMGW (until December 2009, WOYL in Oil City had also been a part of this network, in effect making it a quadcast; WOYL permanently ceased operations in July 2010).  During weekday mornings, WFRA airs a live and local morning show, while WTIV and WMGW air their own live local morning show with local content exclusive to the immediate area.  After the morning show, the three-station trimulcast begins.

Though most programming, sales and administrative functions originate out of Forever Broadcasting's office in Meadville, WFRA maintains a separate office at 484 Allegheny Blvd in Franklin.  Local sales efforts and the WFRA morning show also originate out of this location.

External links
 

FRA
Radio stations established in 1958
1958 establishments in Pennsylvania